Cephalus (Ancient Greek: Κέφαλος Kephalos means "head") is a name used both for the hero-figure in Greek mythology and carried as a theophoric name by historical persons.

Mythological

 Cephalus, son of Hermes and Herse.
 Cephalus, son of Deion/Deioneos, husband of Procris.

Historical

Cephalus, son of Lysanias from Syracuse (5th century BCE), a wealthy metic and elderly arms manufacturer living in Athens who engages in dialogue with Socrates in Plato's Republic. He was the father of orator Lysias, philosopher Polemarchus and Euthydemus.
Cephalus, Athenian orator who flourished after the time of the Thirty Tyrants.
Cephalus, a Molossian who sided with Perseus in the Third Macedonian War.

See also

 List of commonly used taxonomic affixes

Notes

References 

 Gaius Julius Hyginus, Fabulae from The Myths of Hyginus translated and edited by Mary Grant. University of Kansas Publications in Humanistic Studies. Online version at the Topos Text Project.
 Pseudo-Apollodorus, The Library with an English Translation by Sir James George Frazer, F.B.A., F.R.S. in 2 Volumes, Cambridge, MA, Harvard University Press; London, William Heinemann Ltd. 1921. . Online version at the Perseus Digital Library. Greek text available from the same website.

External links
Dictionary of Greek and Roman Biography and Mythology Cephalus

Kings in Greek mythology
Aeolides
Ancient Greek merchants
Ancient Epirotes